Yevgeni Yuryevich Ivanov (born 24 August 1979) is a former Russian professional football player.

External links
 Career summary by sportbox.ru
 

1979 births
Living people
Russian footballers
Association football midfielders
Russian Premier League players
Cypriot First Division players
PFC Krylia Sovetov Samara players
Russian expatriate footballers
Expatriate footballers in Cyprus
Apollon Limassol FC players
FC Akhmat Grozny players
FC Volgar Astrakhan players
FC Lokomotiv Kaluga players
FC Dynamo Saint Petersburg players
FC Novokuznetsk players
FC Dynamo Bryansk players